Robert Guy Newton (1 June 1905 – 25 March 1956) was an English actor. Along with Errol Flynn, Newton was one of the more popular actors among the male juvenile audience of the 1940s and early 1950s, especially with British boys. Known for his hard-living lifestyle, he was cited as a role model by the actor Oliver Reed and the Who's drummer Keith Moon.

Beginning his career in theatre in the 1920s, Newton appeared in numerous plays in the West End, including Bitter Sweet by Noël Coward. In 1939 he starred as Horatio in Hamlet at the Old Vic theatre opposite Laurence Olivier's Prince Hamlet. After serving in the Royal Navy during the Second World War, he had his major break on screen playing the lead in This Happy Breed (1944) and starring in Olivier's version of Henry V (1944). These appearances saw British exhibitors vote him the 10th most popular British film star of 1944.

Newton is best remembered for his portrayal of the feverish-eyed Long John Silver in the 1950 RKO-Disney British adaptation of Treasure Island, the film that became the standard for screen portrayals of historical pirates. He starred as Edward Teach (Blackbeard) in Blackbeard the Pirate in 1952 and Long John Silver again in the 1954 film of the same title, which spawned a miniseries in the mid-1950s. Born in Dorset in the West Country of England and growing up in Cornwall near Land's End, his exaggeration of his West Country accent is credited with popularising the stereotypical "pirate voice". Newton has become the "patron saint" of the annual International Talk Like a Pirate Day.

Early life
Robert Guy Newton was born on 1 June 1905 in Shaftesbury, Dorset, a son of the landscape painter Algernon Newton, R.A. He was educated in Lamorna near Penzance, Cornwall, where he lived with his family from 1912 to 1918, then at Exeter School and St Bartholomew's School in Newbury, Berkshire.

Early career
His acting career began at the age of 16 at the Birmingham Repertory Theatre in 1921. He appeared in many repertory shows until he went to Canada where he worked on a cattle ranch for a year.

He returned to England and performed in many plays in the West End of London, including Bitter Sweet by Noël Coward, The Letter with Gladys Cooper, and Cardboard Lover with Tallulah Bankhead. He also appeared in Private Lives on Broadway, taking over the role from his friend Laurence Olivier. From 1932 to 1934, he was the manager of the Shilling Theatre in Fulham, London.  He had a small role in the film Reunion (1932).

Newton was put under contract to Alexander Korda who cast him in small roles in the cinema films Fire Over England (1937), Dark Journey (1937), Farewell Again (1937) and The Squeaker (1937). He also had a part as Cassius in the abandoned version of I, Claudius and in 21 Days (shot in 1937, released 1940). Newton was borrowed by 20th Century Fox for The Green Cockatoo (1937). Newton had a good role supporting Charles Laughton in Vessel of Wrath (1938). He had another strong part in Yellow Sands (1939) and had his first film lead in Dead Men are Dangerous (1939). He made another with Laughton, Jamaica Inn (1939), playing the romantic male lead, directed by Alfred Hitchcock. In 1939, he played Horatio to Laurence Olivier's Hamlet at the Old Vic, in a production that included Alec Guinness and Michael Redgrave. Newton kept busy as a film actor, appearing in Poison Pen (1939) and Hell's Cargo (1939).

Newton continued primarily as a supporting actor in films, appearing in Gaslight (1940), Busman's Honeymoon (1940), Bulldog Sees It Through (1940), Channel Incident (1940) and Major Barbara (1941), directed by Gabriel Pascal from the play by George Bernard Shaw. Newton got another chance as a star in Hatter's Castle (1942), opposite Deborah Kerr and James Mason. He consolidated his status by playing opposite Anna Neagle in the Amy Johnson biopic They Flew Alone (1942), playing Jim Mollison.

Military service
Newton enlisted in the Royal Navy and saw active service in the rank of an Able Seaman on board , which fought as an escort ship on several Russian convoys. After two and a half years in the Royal Navy he was medically discharged in 1943.

Return to acting
On resuming his film career, Newton played the lead in This Happy Breed (1944), a role played on stage by Noël Coward. Directed by David Lean, it was a huge hit. So too was the Laurence Olivier version of Henry V (1944), in which Newton played Ancient Pistol. These appearances helped British exhibitors vote him the 10th most popular British film star of 1944. During the war, he starred in the West End in No Orchids for Miss Blandish, which was a hit.

Newton had the star role in a thriller Night Boat to Dublin (1946), then had a showy cameo role in Odd Man Out (1947); this performance later was immortalised in Harold Pinter's play Old Times. He stayed in leads for Temptation Harbour (1947) and Snowbound (1948). Lean cast him as Bill Sikes in Oliver Twist (1948), a huge success critically and commercially.

Hollywood
He then made a series of films with Hollywood stars and/or financing: Kiss the Blood Off My Hands (1948), a film noir with Joan Fontaine and Burt Lancaster; Obsession (1949), a thriller directed by Edward Dmytryk, playing a cuckolded husband who exacts revenge on his wife. He played Long John Silver in Walt Disney's version of Treasure Island (1950), shot in the UK, with Bobby Driscoll and directed by Byron Haskin. Less well known is Waterfront (1950) in which Richard Burton appeared in his first film.

His final performance on stage was in the 1950 production of Gaslight with Rosamund John at the Vaudeville Theatre.

Treasure Islands success prompted Newton to return to Hollywood. He was one of several British actors in Soldiers Three (1951), an Imperial adventure tale. He returned to Britain for Tom Brown's Schooldays (1951) to play Thomas Arnold, then was cast by 20th Century Fox as Javert in their version of Les Misérables (1952). In 1951, he was voted the sixth most popular British star in Britain.

Gabriel Pascal gave him the star lead in Androcles and the Lion (1952), another Shaw adaptation. It was made by RKO who cast Newton in the title role of Blackbeard the Pirate (1952).

Fox asked him back for The Desert Rats (1953) opposite Richard Burton and James Mason, playing a drunken school teacher who discovers bravery during World War II. He was one of several names in an airplane disaster movie The High and the Mighty (1954).he was in Hitchcock half hour episode playing a tramp blackmailing a business man 

Back in Britain, Newton was given the lead in The Beachcomber (1954), a remake of Vessels of Wrath, this time in the part originally played by Charles Laughton. He again played Long John Silver in an  Australian-made film, Long John Silver (1954). It was shot at Pagewood Studios, Sydney and directed by Byron Haskin, who had directed Treasure Island. The company went on to make a 26-episode 1955 TV series, The Adventures of Long John Silver, in which Newton also starred. Earlier in 1954, he quit the film Svengali for personal reasons to be replaced by Sir Donald Wolfit which left him open to a legal action while filming in Australia in 1954.

His last screen appearance was as Inspector Fix in Around the World in 80 Days (1956) opposite David Niven, Shirley MacLaine and the Mexican star Cantinflas. It won the Academy Award for the Best Picture in 1956.

Personal life
Newton married four times and had three children: Sally Newton (born 1930), Nicholas Newton (born 1950) and Kim Newton (born 1953).

He was accused of kidnapping his son, Nicholas, when he took him to Hollywood in 1951, the year his third marriage ended.  After a court battle, Newton's elder son was placed in the custody of his aunt and uncle.

He married his fourth wife, Vera Budnick, in June 1952. They had a son, Kim.

Death
Newton suffered in the latter part of his life from chronic alcoholism and died on 25 March 1956 at age 50, following a heart attack in Beverly Hills, California. His body was cremated, and there is a plaque in Westwood Village Memorial Park Cemetery in Los Angeles in his memory. Years later, his son Nicholas scattered his ashes into the south coast of Cornwall in Mount's Bay, near Lamorna in Cornwall, where his father had spent his childhood.

Filmography 

 The Tremarne Case (1924)
 Reunion (1932)
 Fire Over England (1937) as Don Pedro
 Dark Journey (1937) as Officer of U-Boat
 Farewell Again (1937) as Jim Carter
 The Squeaker (1937) as Larry Graeme
 The Green Cockatoo (1937) as Dave Connor
 I, Claudius (1937) as Cassius, Capt. of Caligula's Guard
 Vessel of Wrath (1938) as the Controleur
 Yellow Sands (1938) as Joe Varwell
 Dead Men Are Dangerous (1939) as Aylmer Franklyn
 Jamaica Inn (1939) as James 'Jem' Trehearne - Sir Humphrey's Gang
 Poison Pen (1939) as Sam Hurrin
 Hell's Cargo (1939) as Cmdr. Tomasou
 21 Days (1940) as Tolley
 Gaslight (1940) as Vincent Ullswater
 Busman's Honeymoon (1940) as Frank Crutchley
 Bulldog Sees It Through (1940) as Watkins
 Channel Incident (1940, Short) as Tanner
 Major Barbara (1941) as Bill Walker
 Hatter's Castle (1942) as James Brodie
 They Flew Alone (1942) as Jim Mollison
 A Battle for a Bottle (1942, Short)
 This Happy Breed (1944) as Frank Gibbons
 Henry V (1944) as Ancient Pistol
 Night Boat to Dublin (1946) as Capt. David Grant
 Odd Man Out (1947) as Lukey
 Temptation Harbour (1947) as Bert Mallison
 Snowbound (1948) as Derek Engles
 Oliver Twist (1948) as Bill Sikes
 Kiss the Blood Off My Hands (1948) as Harry Carter
 Obsession (1949) as Dr. Clive Riordan
 Treasure Island (1950) as Long John Silver
 Waterfront (1950) as Peter McCabe
 Soldiers Three (1951) as Pvt. Bill Sykes
 Tom Brown's Schooldays (1951) as Dr. Thomas Arnold
 Les Misérables (1952) as Etienne Javert
 Androcles and the Lion (1952) as Ferrovius
 Blackbeard the Pirate (1952) as Edward Teach / Blackbeard
 The Desert Rats (1953) as Tom Bartlett
 The High and the Mighty (1954) as Gustave Pardee
 The Beachcomber (1954) as Edward 'Honorable Ted' Wilson
 Long John Silver (1954) as Long John Silver
 The Adventures of Long John Silver (1954, TV Series) as Long John Silver
 Around the World in 80 Days (1956) as Inspector Fix

Box-office rankings
For several years, Newton was voted by exhibitors as among the most popular British stars at the local box office:

 9th most popular British star in 1947
 5th most popular British star in 1950 (10th most popular star overall)
 7th most popular British star in 1951

Radio appearances

References

External links 

 
 
 A Tribute to Robert Newton, includes biography
 Britmovie article
 Short biography of Newton's artist father
 

1905 births
1956 deaths
20th-century English male actors
English male film actors
English male stage actors
English male television actors
People educated at Exeter School
People educated at St. Bartholomew's School
People from Shaftesbury
Royal Navy personnel of World War II
Royal Navy sailors
British expatriate male actors in the United States